Events from the year 1698 in Ireland.

Incumbent
Monarch: William III

Events
Early – William Molyneux publishes The Case of Ireland's being Bound by Acts of Parliament in England, Stated.
Famine in the Scottish Borders leads to continued Scottish Presbyterian migration from Scotland to Ulster.
The Lord Mayor of Dublin's gold chain of office is presented by King William III to Dublin Corporation.
John Dunton publishes Teague Land: or A Merry Ramble to the Wild Irish.
John Hopkins publishes the poem The Triumphs of Peace, or the Glories of Nassau … written at the time of his Grace the Duke of Ormond's entrance into Dublin.

Births

June 15 – George Browne, soldier of fortune, general in the Russian army (d. 1792)
Ross Roe MacMahon, Roman Catholic Bishop of Clogher, later Archbishop of Armagh (d. 1748)

Deaths

January 15 – Richard Boyle, 1st Earl of Burlington, cavalier and Lord High Treasurer of Ireland (b. 1612)
January – Dáibhí Ó Bruadair, poet (b. 1625)
October 11 – William Molyneux, natural philosopher and writer, founded the Dublin Philosophical Society (b. 1656)

References

 
Years of the 17th century in Ireland
1690s in Ireland
Ireland